Prudencia Félix Juárez Capilla (born 28 April 1957) is a Mexican politician from the National Action Party. From 2010 to 2012 she served as Deputy of the LXI Legislature of the Mexican Congress representing Tlaxcala.

References

1957 births
Living people
Politicians from Tlaxcala
Women members of the Chamber of Deputies (Mexico)
National Action Party (Mexico) politicians
21st-century Mexican politicians
21st-century Mexican women politicians
Meritorious Autonomous University of Puebla alumni
Members of the Congress of Tlaxcala
20th-century Mexican politicians
20th-century Mexican women politicians
Deputies of the LXI Legislature of Mexico
Members of the Chamber of Deputies (Mexico) for Tlaxcala